Kupreyevo is a rural locality (a village) and the administrative center of Kupreyevskoye Rural Settlement, Gus-Khrustalny District, Vladimir Oblast, Russia. The population was 670 as of 2010. There are 5 streets.

Geography 
Kupreyevo is located 55 km southeast of Gus-Khrustalny (the district's administrative centre) by road. Yakimets is the nearest rural locality.

References 

Rural localities in Gus-Khrustalny District